Lara Lea Trump ( Yunaska; born October 12, 1982) is an American former television producer who is married to Eric Trump, third child of Donald Trump. She was the producer and host of Trump Productions' Real News Update and a producer of Inside Edition.

Early life and education
Lara Yunaska was born in Wilmington, North Carolina, on October 12, 1982, to Robert Luke Yunaska and Linda Ann Sykes. She has a younger brother, Kyle Robert Yunaska. She attended Emsley A. Laney High School. Trump graduated cum laude with a bachelor of Arts degree in communication from North Carolina State University and also studied at the French Culinary Institute in New York.

Career 
Trump was a story coordinator and producer for the TV news magazine Inside Edition from 2012 to 2016. On March 29, 2021, Trump joined Fox News as a contributor.

In December 2022, Fox News announced they parted ways with Trump after her father in-law, Donald Trump, declared his reelection bid. Fox's policy is not to employ anyone running for office or involved with a candidate.

Donald Trump presidential campaigns
During Donald Trump's 2016 presidential campaign, she spearheaded the Trump–Pence Women's Empowerment Tour and served as the Trump Tower liaison for Brad Parscale's Giles-Parscale company. After her father-in-law was elected president, she became an online producer and fundraiser for him.

In April 2019, she described German chancellor Angela Merkel's decision to accept refugees during the European migrant crisis of 2015 as "the downfall of Germany; it was one of the worst things that ever happened to Germany."

She was a senior consultant to Parscale for Trump's reelection campaign in 2020. The campaign paid her $180,000 a year through Parscale's private company, Parscale Strategy. Lara Trump was a surrogate on the stump and took on broad advisory roles. She also campaigned with far right activist and conspiracy theorist Laura Loomer.

Potential Senate campaign 

After Lara Trump's father-in-law left office in 2021, it was widely rumored that she would run for the United States Senate seat being vacated by the retiring Richard Burr. However, after several months of media speculation, she declined to run and endorsed the eventual winner, Representative Ted Budd.

Personal life

On November 8, 2014, after a six-year relationship, Lara Trump married her husband in a ceremony at Donald Trump's Mar-a-Lago estate in Palm Beach, Florida. On September 12, 2017, the couple's first child, Eric "Luke" Trump, was born. On August 19, 2019, Lara gave birth to Carolina Dorothy Trump, the couple's second child.

References

External links

1982 births
21st-century American women
American female equestrians
American television hosts
American women television producers
American women television presenters
International Culinary Center alumni
Living people
New York (state) Republicans
North Carolina Republicans
North Carolina State University alumni
Philanthropists from New York (state)
Philanthropists from North Carolina
Sportspeople from Manhattan
Sportspeople from Wilmington, North Carolina
Television personalities from New York City
Television personalities from North Carolina
Television producers from New York City
Lara
Conservatism in the United States